Emin Duraku (1918 – 23 December 1942) was an Albanian Yugoslav partisan active during World War II in Yugoslavia as an organizer of the liberation struggle in Kosovo. He was posthumously proclaimed a national hero of Albania and Yugoslavia.

Biography
Duraku was born in Gjakova in 1918. He was an early Albanian member of the Yugoslav communist movement. He returned to his home region in 1939 and was part of the bureau of the party's regional committee. Duraku was killed by fascist forces in Lipljan and became a martyr to the communist cause. Following his death, an Albanian partisan unit, formed in January 1943, was named after him. An elementary school in Tirana is also named after him.

References

Politicians from Gjakova
League of Communists of Kosovo politicians
Yugoslav Partisans members
1918 births
1942 deaths
Kosovo Albanians
Yugoslav Albanians
Heroes of Albania
Yugoslav military personnel killed in World War II
Recipients of the Order of the People's Hero